Simon Thornton (born 18 March 1977) is an Irish professional golfer. He won the 2013 Najeti Hotels et Golfs Open on the European Tour.

Career
Thornton was a late starter to golf, only taking up the sport in his late teens and turning professional at the advanced age of 28. He began as an assistant club professional at Royal County Down, playing in regional Irish PGA events, where his achievements included recording four straight monthly wins with the Ulster Golfers Alliance. He began playing on the Challenge Tour in 2009, finishing 51st before earning his European Tour card at qualifying school at the end of the season. His debut season on the full tour was unsuccessful, and he returned to the Challenge Tour for 2011, finishing in 12th position to secure a quick return to the European Tour. In June 2013 won the Najeti Hotels et Golfs Open in France, beating Tjaart van der Walt at the first hole on a sudden-death playoff. His win gave him an exemption of the European Tour until the end of 2014. 2014 was, however, a poor season and in 2015 he played a mixture of European Tour and Challenge Tour events but failed to retain his card on either tour.

Professional wins (7)

European Tour wins (1)

1Dual-ranking event with the Challenge Tour

European Tour playoff record (1–0)

Challenge Tour wins (1)

1Dual-ranking event with the European Tour

Challenge Tour playoff record (1–0)

PGA EuroPro Tour wins (2)

Other wins (4)
2005 Ulster PGA Championship
2011 Irish PGA Championship
2018 Irish PGA Championship
2020 Irish PGA Championship

Team appearances
Professional
PGA Cup (representing Great Britain and Ireland): 2022

See also
2009 European Tour Qualifying School graduates
2011 Challenge Tour graduates

References

External links

Irish male golfers
European Tour golfers
Sportspeople from Bradford
Sportspeople from County Down
1977 births
Living people